Academy of Florence or Accademia di Firenze may refer to:

 The Galleria dell'Accademia, an art museum in Florence
 The Accademia di Belle Arti di Firenze, or academy of fine arts of Florence
 The Accademia Fiorentina delle Arti del Disegno, a learned society for the arts in Florence

See also
 Accademia Fiorentina (disambiguation)